Tenno (Tén in local dialect) is a comune (municipality) in Trentino in the northern Italian region Trentino-Alto Adige/Südtirol, located about  southwest of Trento.

Tenno borders the following municipalities: Comano Terme, Fiavè, Arco, Ledro and Riva del Garda.

Tenno contains the waterfalls of Cascate del Varone.

Tenno hosts an yearly summer festival called Quarta d'Agosto (Fourth of August) which is celebrated the fourth Sunday of August, in Cologna.

References

External links

Official website 
Tenno tourist information

Cities and towns in Trentino-Alto Adige/Südtirol